Güira de Melena Municipal Museum is a museum located in the 82nd street in Güira de Melena, Cuba. It was established as a museum on 11 December 1980.

The museum holds collections on history, weaponry and decorative arts.

See also 
 List of museums in Cuba

References 

Museums in Cuba
Buildings and structures in Artemisa Province
Museums established in 1980
1980 establishments in Cuba
20th-century architecture in Cuba